Maria (5 August 1848 in Scarborough – 3 March 1941 in Scalby), the youngest daughter of Quaker John Rowntree, a grocer in Scarborough, and Jane Priestman.

In 1867, she married John Ellis in the Friends Meeting House in Scarborough.

Maria had 5 children:
 John Rowntree Ellis, born 1868, died 1889 of rheumatic fever
 Arthur Edward Ellis born 1870, committed suicide in 1891
 Harold Thornton Ellis, born 1875
 twin daughters, Marian Emily and Edith Ellis, born 1878.

Wrea Head Hall in Scalby was built during 1881-2 and the family moved there from Nottingham in April 1883.

Maria died on 3 March 1941 in Scalby.

References

English Quakers
People from Nottingham
1848 births
1941 deaths
People from Scarborough, North Yorkshire
Maria